Portobello/Craigmillar is one of the seventeen wards used to elect members of the City of Edinburgh Council. Established in 2007 along with the other wards, it elects four Councillors.

As its name suggests, the ward's territory is based around the communities of Craigmillar and Portobello in the east of the city's urban area up to the boundary with Musselburgh (East Lothian) and the coast on the Firth of Forth, also including the neighbourhoods of Bingham, Brunstane, Cleikimin, Eastfield, Greendykes, Joppa, Magdalene, Newcraighall and Niddrie. A minor boundary change in 2017 saw the addition of the western part of the Durham neighbourhood which, combined with housebuilding in the existing area (new and redeveloped), was sufficient to push the population over the threshold for a fourth councillor. In 2019, the ward had a population of 31,957.

Councillors

Election results

2022 election
2022 City of Edinburgh Council election

2017 election
2017 City of Edinburgh Council election

2012 election
2012 City of Edinburgh Council election

2007 election
2007 City of Edinburgh Council election

References

External links
Listed Buildings in Portobello/Craigmillar Ward, East Lothian [sic] at British Listed Buildings

Wards of Edinburgh
Portobello, Edinburgh